C76 may refer to :
 Ruy Lopez chess openings ECO code
 Honda C71, C76, C72, C77 Dream, motorcycle different models
 Malignant neoplasm of other and ill-defined sites ICD-10 code
 HMS Newcastle (C76), a 1936 British Royal Navy cruiser
 Wages, Hours of Work and Manning (Sea) Convention, 1946 code
 Creative Technology Singapore Exchange code
 Scania-Vabis bus model
 C76 sound CPU in 1996 Namco arcade game system 
 Caldwell 76 (NGC 6231), the "False Comet Cluster", an open cluster in the constellation Scorpius

C-76 may refer to :
 Curtiss-Wright C-76 Caravan, a 1943 military aircraft
 Elections Modernization Act in Canada, enacted as Bill C-76